Machu-Picchu may refer to:

 8277 Machu-Picchu, a main-belt asteroid
 Machu Picchu, a 15th-century Inca fortification in Peru